Blue Canyon Wind Farm is the largest wind farm in Oklahoma, United States. The project, located in the Slick Hills north of Lawton, consists of four phases with a total output of 423.45 MW.
, Blue Canyon remains Oklahoma's largest wind farm; however, several organizations including Oklahoma Gas & Electric plan to greatly increase Oklahoma's wind power capacity, and future projects may be larger.

Blue Canyon I 
Blue Canyon I consists of 45 Vestas NM72 1.65 MW wind turbines, with a collective nameplate capacity of 74.25 MW. It began commercial operations in December 2003, and is owned by EDP Renewables North America and Energent, L.P. Infrastructure Fund.

Blue Canyon II 
Blue Canyon II consists of 84 Vestas V80 1.8 MW wind turbines, with a collective nameplate capacity of an additional 151.2 MW. It is owned and operated by Horizon Wind Energy, a subsidiary of Energias de Portugal, a world leading Portuguese utility,  it began commercial operations in December 2005.

Blue Canyon V 
Blue Canyon V consists of 66 GE sle 1.5 MW turbines, with a collective nameplate capacity of an additional 99 MW. It began commercial operations in December 2009.

Blue Canyon VI 
Blue Canyon VI consists of 55 Vestas V90 1.8 MW turbines, with a collective nameplate capacity of an additional 99 MW.

Electricity production

Gallery

See also

List of large wind farms

Wind power in the United States

References

Buildings and structures in Comanche County, Oklahoma
Wind farms in Oklahoma